Chris Hardy (born June 6, 1972 in Edmonton, Alberta) is a former professional Canadian Football safety. He was drafted by the Edmonton Eskimos in the sixth round of the 1997 CFL Draft. He played CIS Football at Manitoba. and Jamestown College in Jamestown North Dakota and Junior football with the Edmonton Huskies

Hardy also played for the Toronto Argonauts in his career and, in addition to his duties at the safety position, he was the team's back-up punter and placekicker. Hardy retired from the CFL on February 27, 2009.

After retiring from the CFL, Chris moved to Edmonton, Alberta.

He now maintains a career as a courier.

References

External links
 Canadian Football League profile

Living people
1972 births
Canadian football defensive backs
Canadian football placekickers
Canadian football punters
Edmonton Elks players
Manitoba Bisons football players
Players of Canadian football from Alberta
Canadian football people from Edmonton
Toronto Argonauts players